Noyes Island is located in the Alexander Archipelago of Southeast Alaska, United States. It is located west of Prince of Wales Island. It was named in 1879 by William Healy Dall of the U.S. Coast and Geodetic Survey after William M. Noyes, also of the USC&GS, who was stationed in Alaska from 1873 to 1880. The first European to notice the island was Aleksei Chirikov in 1741.

References

Islands of the Alexander Archipelago
Islands of Prince of Wales–Hyder Census Area, Alaska
Islands of Alaska
Islands of Unorganized Borough, Alaska